Homeobox protein Hox-A2 is a protein that in humans is encoded by the HOXA2 gene.

Function 

In vertebrates, the genes encoding the class of transcription factors called homeobox genes are found in clusters named A, B, C, and D on four separate chromosomes. Expression of these proteins is spatially and temporally regulated during embryonic development. This gene is part of the A cluster on chromosome 7 and encodes a DNA-binding transcription factor which may regulate gene expression, morphogenesis, and differentiation. The encoded protein may be involved in the placement of hindbrain segments in the proper location along the anterior-posterior axis during development. Two transcript variants encoding two different isoforms have been found for this gene, with only one of the isoforms containing the homeodomain region.

HOXA2 controls the embryonic development of the lower and middle part of the face and of the middle ear. Mutations in it are known to cause microtia, hearing impairment, and cleft palate.

See also
 Homeobox

References

Further reading

Transcription factors